From This Place is a studio album by American jazz guitarist Pat Metheny, released in February 2020 on the Nonesuch label.

Track listing 
All tracks are written by Pat Metheny.

Personnel 

The individuals involved in the making of the album include Metheny and his traveling ensemble, plus a number of studio musicians, listed below.

 Pat Metheny – guitars, keyboards, arranger, composer, producer
 Gwilym Simcock – piano, arranger
 Linda May Han Oh – bass, vocals, arranger
 Antonio Sánchez – drums

References 

2020 albums
Pat Metheny albums
Nonesuch Records albums